The CEV Challenge Cup is the third tier official competition for men's volleyball clubs from the whole of Europe. 

It started in the 1980–81 season under the name CEV Cup. In 2007 it was renamed CEV Challenge Cup.

History
 CEV Cup (1980–81 to 2006–2007)
 CEV Challenge Cup (2007–08 to present)

Title holders

 1980–81:  AS Cannes
 1981–82:  Star Lift Voorburg
 1982–83:  Panini Modena
 1983–84:  Panini Modena
 1984–85:  Panini Modena
 1985–86:  Kutiba Falconara
 1986–87:  Ener–Mix Milano
 1987–88:  Avtomobilist Leningrad
 1988–89:  Avtomobilist Leningrad
 1989–90:  Moerser SC
 1990–91:  Sisley Treviso
 1991–92:  Maxicono Parma
 1992–93:  Sisley Treviso
 1993–94:  Ignis Padova

 1994–95:  Pallavolo Parma
 1995–96:  Alpitour Traco Cuneo
 1996–97:  Porto Ravenna Volley
 1997–98:  Sisley Treviso
 1998–99:  Palermo Volley
 1999–00:  Roma Volley
 2000–01:  Lube Banca Marche Macerata
 2001–02:  Noicom Cuneo
 2002–03:  Sisley Treviso
 2003–04:  Kerakoll Modena
 2004–05:  Lube Banca Marche Macerata
 2005–06:  Lube Banca Marche Macerata
 2006–07:  Fakel Novy Urengoy
 2007–08:  Cimone Modena

 2008–09:  Arkas İzmir
 2009–10:  RPA Perugia
 2010–11:  Lube Banca Marche Macerata
 2011–12:  Tytan AZS Częstochowa
 2012–13:  Copra Elior Piacenza
 2013–14:  Fenerbahçe Grundig
 2014–15:  Vojvodina Novi Sad
 2015–16:  Calzedonia Verona
 2016–17:  Fakel Novy Urengoy
 2017–18:  Bunge Ravenna 
 2018–19:  Belogorie Belgorod
 2020–21:  Allianz Powervolley Milano
 2021–22:  Narbonne Volley
 2022–23:  Olympiacos Piraeus

Finals

CEV Cup

CEV Challenge Cup

Titles by club

Titles by country

References

External links
 Official Website – European Volleyball Confederation

 
Challenge Cup
European volleyball records and statistics
Recurring sporting events established in 1980
1980 establishments in Europe
Multi-national professional sports leagues